"Some Memories Just Won't Die" is a song written by Bobby Lee Springfield, and recorded by American country music artist Marty Robbins.  It was released in April 1982 as the first single from his album Come Back to Me.  The song reached #10 on the Billboard Hot Country Singles chart and #1 on the RPM Country Tracks chart in Canada.  On June 6, 1983, at the 17th annual Music City News Country Awards in Nashville, the song was named "Single of the Year" for 1982, giving Robbins a posthumous honor.

Chart performance

References

1982 singles
1982 songs
Marty Robbins songs
Columbia Records singles
Song recordings produced by Bob Montgomery (songwriter)